Galesburg is the name of some places in the United States of America:
Galesburg, Illinois, the largest city in the US named Galesburg
Galesburg, Iowa
Galesburg, Kansas
Galesburg, Michigan
Galesburg, Jasper County, Missouri
Galesburg, Putnam County, Missouri
Galesburg, North Dakota